Larissos is a former municipality in Achaea, West Greece, Greece. Since the 2011 local government reform it is part of the municipality West Achaea, of which it is a municipal unit. The municipal unit has an area of 225.729 km2. Its seat of administration was in the village Lappas, part of the community Metochi. The municipal unit was named after the river Larissos, which flows through it. It is the westernmost municipal unit of Achaea, stretching along the Ionian Sea coast and the border with Elis to the southern part of the Movri hills. It is about 32 km southwest of Patras is 37and 50 km north of Pyrgos.

The area is mostly flat, except the Movri hills in the southeast and the lower Mavra Vouna hills in the northwest, near Cape Araxos. Araxos Airport (GPA). The archaeological site of the ancient town of Dyme is located 1 km south.

Subdivisions
The municipal unit Larissos is subdivided into the following communities (constituent villages in brackets):
Agios Nikolaos Spaton (Agios Nikolaos, Agios Konstantinos)
Apideonas
Araxos (Araxos, Kalogria, Paralimni)
Kagkadi
Lakkopetra (Lakkopetra, Ioniki Akti, Karnari, Limanaki)
Mataragka (Mataragka, Kafalaiika)
Metochi (Metochi, Lappas, Neo Vouprasio, Vouprasio)
Michoi (Michoi, Kandalos, Tsamaiika, Psefteika)
Petas
Riolos (Riolos, Mazaiika)
Velitses (Ano Velitses, Kato Velitses)

Population history

Football (soccer) clubs
Akadimos Larissou
Atromitos Lappa, a football (soccer) club currently playing in the Fourth Division
Ikaros Lakkopetra
Metochi FC

See also
List of settlements in Achaea

References

External links
Municipal unit of Larissos

Populated places in Achaea